Candy Land, or Candyland, is a racing board game currently published by Hasbro.

Candy Land or Candyland may also refer to:

 Candyland (album), a 2016 album by Theatres des Vampires
 Candyland (group), an American musical duo
 "Candyland" (song), a song by Gwen Stefani
 Candy Land (film), a 2022 horror film directed by John Swab
 Candy Land: The Great Lollipop Adventure a 2005 animated film
 Candyland, a fictional plantation in the 2012 film Django Unchained
 CandyLand, a confectionery brand owned by Ismail Industries Limited
 Candy Land, a game show on the Food Network